Sagina subulata ((syn. Sagina pilifera), the heath pearlwort, Irish-moss, awl-leaf pearlwort or Scottish moss, is a species of flowering plant in the pink and carnation family Caryophyllaceae. It is native to Europe, from Iceland south to Spain, and east to southern Sweden and Romania. It occurs on dry sandy or gravelly soils.

Description

Heath pearlwort is a low-growing prostrate perennial plant forming a thick, dense mat with stems less than 10 cm long, and slender subulate (awl-shaped) leaves up to 1 cm long. The flowers are 4–5 mm in diameter, with five white petals the same length as the green sepals; they are produced singly on erect stems 2–4 cm long. The seeds are smooth, brown, triangular shaped, 0.4–0.5 mm, produced in a capsule 2.5–3 mm long.

British Isles
Sagina subulata is native to temperate areas of Europe. In the British Isles it is primarily found in Scotland, the Lake District, Wales, the Southwest and South of England, and the coasts of western Ireland. This mat-forming perennial, easy to overlook when not in flower, is found in dry, open, sandy or gravelly places, trackways, heaths, dry banks and grassy slopes near the sea. In the Trotternish Mountains on Skye, it is found on rocky ledges growing with Koenigia islandica.

Varieties
There are two varieties, Sagina subulata var. subulata with glandular-hairy sepals, and Sagina subulata var. glabrata Gillot with hairless sepals; the latter is often a lawn weed, and has been confused with the related Mediterranean species Sagina pilifera. The cultivar 'Aurea' (referred to as Scottish or Scotch Moss in the horticultural trade) is grown as a garden plant.

References

External links

subulata